Chisosa is a genus of cellar spiders that was first described by B. A. Huber in 2000.  it contains only three species, found in Aruba, the United States, Mexico, and on the Lesser Antilles: C. baja, C. caquetio, and C. diluta.

See also
 List of Pholcidae species

References

Araneomorphae genera
Pholcidae
Spiders of North America